Mariam (Marika) Lortkipanidze (28 August 1922 – 8 January 2018) was a Soviet and Georgian historian, specializing in the history of Georgia.

Mariam Lortkipanidze was born in Batumi on 28 August 1922. She graduated from Tbilisi State University, Department of History in 1943. Her PhD thesis was "Emirate of Tbilisi" (1948). She became doktor nauk in 1964 and a member of the Georgian National Academy of Sciences in 1993.

Publications
Most widely held works by Mariam Lortʻkʻipʻaniże:
 Adrepʻeodaluri xanis kʻartʻuli saistorio mcerloba, 1966
 Istorija Gruzii XI-načala XIII veka : (naučno-populjarnyj očerk), 1974
 A glimpse of Georgian history, 1983
 Georgia in the XI-XII centuries, 1987
 Apʻxazebi da apʻxazetʻi, 1990
 Essays on Georgian history, 1994

References

1922 births
2018 deaths
20th-century historians from Georgia (country)
Soviet women historians
Rustaveli Prize winners
Members of the Georgian National Academy of Sciences